Palais Liechtenstein may refer to:

Vienna
 Stadtpalais Liechtenstein (Liechtenstein City Palace), owned by the Princely Family of Liechtenstein, in the 1st district of Vienna (Innere Stadt)
 Gartenpalais Liechtenstein (Liechtenstein Garden Palace), part of the Liechtenstein Museum, on the Fürstengasse, in the 9th district of Vienna (Alsergrund)
 :de:Palais Liechtenstein (Herrengasse), a former palace on the Herrengasse

Feldkirch
 :de:Palais Liechtenstein (Feldkirch), in Feldkirch, Austria

Prague
 Liechtenstein Palace (Kampa Island, Prague)
 Liechtenstein Palace (Malostranské náměstí, Prague)